Tushmalan (also Romanized as Tūshmālān; also known as Tashmalān and Toshmalān) is a village in Qazvineh Rural District, in the Central District of Kangavar County, Kermanshah Province, Iran. At the 2006 census, its population was 234, in 59 families.

References 

Populated places in Kangavar County